Relations between the Netherlands and the United States are described as "excellent" by the United States Department of State and "close" by the Ministry of Foreign Affairs of the Netherlands. Official relations were established in 1782 and, as the two were never at war or in serious conflict, were referred to by U.S. President Ronald Reagan in 1982 as "the longest unbroken, peaceful relationship that we have had with any other nation." The two countries have cooperated much in recent decades in anti-terrorism, anti-piracy and peacekeeping missions in the European, Middle Eastern and Central American regions (largely through NATO). They are also the third largest (from the Netherlands to the United States) and largest (from the United States to the Netherlands) direct foreign investors in each other's economies.

History

The U.S. partnership with the Netherlands is one of its oldest continuous relationships and dates back to the American Revolution. Starting in the late 16th century, the Dutch and other Europeans began to colonize the eastern coast of North America. The Dutch named their territory New Netherland, which became a colony of the Dutch Republic in 1624.  The Dutch colonial settlement of New Amsterdam later became New York City. The present-day flag of New York City is based on the flag of Republic of the United Netherlands.

Though the action was disavowed by the government of the Netherlands, on November 16, 1776, the fort at St. Eustatius gave the first formal salute (firing its guns nine times) to a ship flying the American flag. On 19 April 1782, John Adams was received by the States General in The Hague and recognized as Minister Plenipotentiary of the United States of America. By doing so, it became the second foreign country to recognize the United States (after France on February 6, 1778). The house that Adams purchased in The Hague became the first American embassy in the world.

Dutch officers in Sumatra (then part of the Dutch East Indies) assisted the U.S. Navy during the First and Second Sumatran Expeditions in 1832 and 1838 respectively. Both operations were punitive expeditions, carried out against Chiefdom of Kuala Batee after the crews of U.S. merchant ships were massacred by the native Malays.

In 1861–63 the Lincoln administration looked abroad for places to relocate freed slaves who wanted to leave the United States. It opened U.S. negotiations with the Dutch government regarding African American migration and colonization of the Dutch colony of Suriname in South America. Nothing came of the idea, and after 1864 the idea was dropped.

U.S. and Dutch soldiers fought together during the Siege of the International Legations, part of the larger Boxer Rebellion in China.

The Netherlands was steadfastly neutral in the late 19th and early 20th century trading with everyone but avoiding alliances. In foreign affairs it build up its overseas empire especially in the Dutch East Indies (Indonesia). Neutrality did not stop the Nazi invasion in 1940, and after its liberation 1945 neutrality was no longer attractive. The Dutch tried for years to recover its valuable colony of Indonesia, but the United States was impressed with the anti-communist stance of the Indonesian Republic, and insisted that the Dutch leave. Resentfully, they did so, and refocused their attention on West European and trans-Atlantic relations. By the 1950s, according to Giles Scott-Smith the Americans considered the Dutch to be perfect allies in the Cold War:
The Dutch were politically close to the UK and were opposed to European affairs being dominated by either a renewed France or a resurgent Germany....the Dutch body politic, dominated as it was by the democratic socialists and Christian parties, was resoundingly anti-communist in outlook. The Netherlands was also positive towards a US-led free-trade regime, and during the Cold War was wholly committed to building a managed post-war economic and political order based around international organizations such as the International Monetary Fund (IMF), World Bank, and the Organization for Economic Cooperation and Development (OECD).

The U.S. was generous with Marshall Plan funds, designed to modernize Dutch technology and help it integrate into what became the European Union. Membership in NATO solidified close military cooperation.   As prosperity returned, Dutch tourists increasingly came to the United States.  They had become fascinated by American movies, music, and television programs and took advantage of the sharp drop in transatlantic airfares in the 1960s. The tourists chose destinations based on their media exposure, so Hollywood and New York City were favored. Tourism thus reinforced the stereotypical images portrayed in the American media.

Relations became tense in 1981-1984 when Ronald Reagan rejected detente and escalated the Cold War.  According to Doeko Bosscher, Reagan deployed cruise missiles or INF (intermediate-range nuclear forces) weapons at Woensdrecht in the Netherlands to counter new Soviet missile deployments. A wave of protest resulted.  In 1982 four Dutch journalists were killed by Washington-backed government forces in El Salvador. To calm the tension Washington sent a new ambassador Paul Bremer. By 1985, he won Dutch approval for the INF deployment and the Dutch supported Reagan's dealings with Gorbachev.

21st century
The countries were described by President George W. Bush as "brother nations". and by President Barack Obama as "closest friends which friendship will never die". Obama has also said that, "Without the Netherlands there wouldn't be a United States of America as everyone knows it now".

The bilateral relations between the two nations are based on historical and cultural ties as well as a common dedication to individual freedom and human rights. The Netherlands shares with the United States a liberal economic outlook and is committed to free trade. The Netherlands is the third-largest direct foreign investor in the United States, and the Dutch-American trade and investment relationship is supporting close to 625,000 American jobs with Texas, California and Pennsylvania benefiting most from these economic ties. The United States is the third-largest direct foreign investor in the Netherlands.

The United States and the Netherlands often have similar positions on issues and work together both bilaterally and multilaterally in such institutions as the United Nations and NATO. The Dutch have worked with the United States at the World Trade Organization, in the Organisation for Economic Co-operation and Development, as well as within the European Union to advance the shared US goal of a more open and market-led world economy.

The Dutch were allies with the United States in the Korean War and the first Gulf War and have been active in global peacekeeping efforts in the former Yugoslavia, Afghanistan and Iraq. Netherlands also support and participate in NATO and EU training efforts in Iraq. Until August 1, 2010 they were active participants in the International Security Assistance Force and Operation Enduring Freedom in Afghanistan.

As of 2016, The Netherlands is part of the U.S.-led coalition against ISIL in Iraq and Syria.

Diplomatic missions

Dutch missions 

 Washington, D.C. (Embassy)
 Atlanta (Consulate-General)
 Chicago (Consulate-General)
 Miami (Consulate-General)
 New York City (Consulate-General)
 San Francisco (Consulate-General)

Ambassadors

U.S. missions 

 The Hague (Embassy)
 Amsterdam (Consulate-General)

In the Caribbean part of the Kingdom, the U.S. has a consulate-general
 Willemstad (Consulate General of the United States, Curaçao)

The U.S. Consulate General in Willemstad operates as its own mission, with the Consul General as the "Chief of Mission". As such, the Consul General is not under the jurisdiction of the Ambassador to the Netherlands, and reports directly to the U.S. Department of State as do other chiefs of mission, who are ambassadors in charge of embassies.

Ambassadors

 Pete Hoekstra 2018–2021
 Marja Verloop 2021-present

Incidents
 The American Service-Members' Protection Act, passed in 2002 under President George W. Bush, grants the US president authorization to use  "all means necessary and appropriate to bring about the release of any U.S. or allied personnel being detained or imprisoned by, on behalf of, or at the request of the International Criminal Court." It has been derisively nicknamed "The Hague Invasion Act", as it would in theory authorize the president of the United States to invade The Hague, which is the seat of the Dutch government and the seat of several international criminal courts, should they prosecute an American citizen or ally. The act is widely considered to be symbolic, and that the threat of invasion by the U.S. is unrealistic.
 US ambassador Pete Hoekstra had stated previously erroneously in the US in 2015 that 
The Islamic movement has now gotten to a point where they have put Europe into chaos. Chaos in the Netherlands, there are cars being burnt, there are politicians that are being burnt ... and yes, there are no-go zones in the Netherlands.
In an interview on Dutch television on 22 December 2017, Hoekstra first denied having said this, later calling this fake news, then denying that he had called it fake news, before finally offering his apologies the day after.

See also
 Foreign relations of the Netherlands
 Foreign relations of the United States
 Dutch Americans

References

Further reading
 Bootsma, N. "The Discovery of Indonesia: Western (non-Dutch) Historiography on the Decolonization of Indonesia." in Bijdragen tot de Taal-, Land-en Volkenkunde 1ste Afl (1995): 1-22. online in English

 Bosscher, D. F. J. "The Nadir of Dutch-American Relations: Ronald Reagan, El Salvador and Cruise Missiles." in Dynamics of Modernization (VU University Press, 1998) pp. 67-83. excerpt

 de Graaff, Bob, and Cees Wiebes. "Intelligence and the cold war behind the dikes: The relationship between the American and Dutch intelligence communities, 1946–1994." Intelligence and National Security 12.1 (1997): 41–58.
 Foster, Anne L. Projections of Power: The United States and Europe in Colonial Southeast Asia, 1919–1941 (Duke UP, 2010).
 Frey, Marc. "Visions of the Future: The United States and Colonialism in Southeast Asia, 1940-1945." Amerikastudien/American Studies (2003): 365–388. online
 Freise, Christopher. "American grand strategy and US foreign policy towards Indonesia" (PhD. Diss. U of Melbourne 2017) online bibliography on pp. 253–269.
 Gouda, Frances. American Visions of the Netherlands East Indies/Indonesia: US Foreign Policy and Indonesian Nationalism, 1920-1949 (Amsterdam University Press, 2002) online; another copy online
 Homan, Gerlof D. “The Netherlands, the United States, and the Indonesian Question, 1948”, Journal of Contemporary History 24#1  (1990), 123–41.
 Homan, Gerlof D. “The United States and the Netherlands East Indies: the Evolution of American Anticolonialism,” Pacific Historical Review 53#4 (1984), pp. 423–446 online
 Kaplan, Lawrence S. "The founding fathers and the two confederations. The United States of America and the United Provinces of the Netherlands, 1783-1789." BMGN-Low Countries Historical Review 97.3 (1982): 423–438. online
 Koopmans, Joop W. Historical Dictionary of the Netherlands (Rowman & Littlefield, 2015).
 Krabbendam, Hans, et al. eds. Four Centuries of Dutch-American Relations 1609-2009 (Amsterdam: Boom, 2009, 1190 pp.,   A standard scholarly survey.
 Krabbendam, Hans. "Valentine's Days: The Experiences of Marshall Mission Chief Alan C. Valentine in the Netherlands, 1948-1949." European Contributions to American Studies (June 1998), Vol. 41, pp 121–134; on the U.S. Marshall Plan 
 Kroes, Rob, ed. Image and Impact: American Influences in the Netherlands since 1945 (Amsterdam, 1981), 
 Nordholt, Jan Willem Schulte, and Robert P. Swierenga. Bilateral Bicentennial: A History of Dutch-American Relations, 1782-1982 (1982) 279pp

 Scott-Smith, Giles. "The ties that bind: Dutch-American relations, US public diplomacy and the promotion of American Studies since the Second World War." The Hague Journal of Diplomacy 2.3 (2007): 283-305.

 Scott-Smith, Giles. "The Fulbright Program in the Netherlands: An Example of Science Diplomacy." in Cold war science and the transatlantic circulation of knowledge (Brill, 2015) pp. 136-161. online
 Snyder, David J. "The Dutch Encounter with the American Century: Modernization, Clientelism, and the Uses of Sovereignty during the Early Cold War." Dutch Crossing 40.1 (2016): 10–23.
 Staden, A. van. "American-Dutch political relations since 1945. What has changed and why?." BMGN-Low Countries Historical Review 97.3 (1982): 470–488. online
 van Dijk, Cornelis W. "The American Political Intervention in the Conflict in the Dutch East Indies 1945-1949." (Army Command and General Staff College (Fort Leavenworth Kansas, 2009) online.

Primary sources
 Brinks, Herbert J., ed. Dutch American Voices: Letters from the United States, 1850-1930 (Cornell UP, 1995.)

External links

 History of Netherlands - U.S. relations

 
United States
Bilateral relations of the United States
Relations of colonizer and former colony